Timothy James Redding (born February 12, 1978) is an American former professional baseball pitcher and more recently the pitching coach for the Hagerstown Suns. He pitched for the Houston Astros, San Diego Padres, Washington Nationals, New York Yankees, New York Mets, and Toronto Blue Jays organizations.

Early years
Redding was born in Rochester, New York. He graduated from Churchville-Chili Senior High School, then played college baseball at Monroe Community College. He is a grandnephew of actress Joyce Randolph, best known for playing Trixie Norton on The Honeymooners.

Playing career

1997–2004: Houston Astros
In the 1997 Major League Baseball Draft Redding was drafted by the Houston Astros in the 20th round (610th). In 2000, with the Kissimmee Cobras of the Florida State League, he was 12-5 with a 2.68 ERA in 24 starts and was selected as a Baseball America 2nd team Minor League All-Star, a High-A All-Star, Florida State League All-Star and Florida State League Pitcher of the Year. In 2001, with the Round Rock Express, he was selected as a Double-A All-Star, the Texas League Pitcher of the Year (and All-Star) and again was selected to the Baseball America 2nd team Minor League All-Stars. He was also recognized as the #3 prospect in the Astros system.

He made his Major League debut on June 24, 2001 against the Cincinnati Reds, pitching six innings and allowing five earned runs. He recorded his first credited win on July 2 in a seven-inning start against the Milwaukee Brewers. He appeared in 13 games, with 9 starts in 2001, finishing 3-1 with a 5.50 ERA. He split 2002 between the AAA New Orleans Zephyrs and the Astros, before becoming a regular part of the Houston rotation in 2003. He made 32 starts that year, finishing 10-14 with a 3.68 ERA. In 2004, he was in 27 games, but only 17 were starts and he was 5-7 with a 5.72 ERA.

2005: San Diego Padres and New York Yankees
On March 28, 2005 he was traded to the San Diego Padres for Humberto Quintero.

In 2005, Redding would go 0-5 with a 9.31 ERA in nine games (6 starts) with the Padres, while battling injuries, until he was traded to the New York Yankees with Darrell May for Paul Quantrill. The Yankees starting rotation was hurt by injuries and they decided to take "a chance" with Redding.  However, his stint with the Yankees would be short lived—he started and lasted one inning against the Boston Red Sox, allowing six runs on four hits and four walks. The next day, he was designated for assignment to allow a spot for pitcher Al Leiter. He spent the rest of the season in AAA with the Columbus Clippers.

2006: Chicago White Sox
In 2006, Redding spent the entire season in the minor leagues.  He signed a minor league contract with the Chicago White Sox and was assigned to their Triple-A affiliate, the Charlotte Knights. He became a key component of the Knights' pitching rotation, finishing the 2006 season with a 12-10 record and 3.40 ERA in 29 appearances. He led the team in strikeouts (148) and complete games (5). On September 6, 2006, Redding pitched a four-hit shutout against the Toledo Mud Hens in the International League playoffs. At the end of the season, he opted for minor league free agency, and in November signed a minor-league deal with the Washington Nationals.

2007–2008: Washington Nationals
In 2007, with the Nationals, Redding had a rough spring training, allowing 11 runs in 8-2/3 inning, and not making the major league club. At Triple-A Columbus, he compiled a 9-5 record with an ERA of 5.32, by the end of June. The Nationals, beset by injuries to its starting pitching rotation, purchased Redding's contract, and in July he made his first big league start since 2005. He went 5 innings, being tagged with three runs and the loss. He followed that start, however, with a six-inning stint, where he allowed 2 runs on five hits, and earned his first win as a major leaguer since September 26, 2004, and first as a starter since July 24.

In 2008, Redding went 10-11 with a 4.95 ERA despite his post-All-Star break slump where he went 3-8 with a 6.92 ERA. Redding also was the victim of seven blown saves, tying for first in the majors. At the season's end, he was non-tendered by the Nationals, making him a free agent.

2009: New York Mets
In January , Redding signed a one-year, $2.25 million deal with the New York Mets.  Going into spring training, Redding was a candidate to be the fifth starter. He struggled in the games that he pitched in and during the middle of spring training he was "shut down" due to right shoulder fatigue. It was speculated that his shoulder fatigue was caused by his own error. Redding had offseason foot surgery and he had been rushing back to make sure he had secured a spot in the Opening Day rotation. Tim made his first start of the 2009 season on May 18 against the Los Angeles Dodgers and allowed 2 earned runs over 6 innings. He was non-tendered by the Mets following the season.

2010: Colorado Rockies, New York Yankees, and Samsung Lions
On January 26, 2010, Redding signed a minor league contract with the Colorado Rockies. On May 12, 2010, he was released by the Rockies and signed to a minor-league deal with the New York Yankees.  Redding was named International League pitcher of the week on August 2.

On August 5, he was signed with Samsung Lions of the KBO League.

2011: Los Angeles Dodgers and Philadelphia Phillies
On January 3, the Los Angeles  Dodgers signed Redding to a minor league contract with an invite to Spring training. He was assigned to the AAA Albuquerque Isotopes.

He opted out of his Dodger contract in June and signed a minor league contract with the Philadelphia Phillies.

He was released by Phillies after pitching in 5 games for the Lehigh Valley IronPigs.

2012: Toronto Blue Jays
Redding signed a minor league contract with the Toronto Blue Jays on January 27, 2012. Redding played for the Las Vegas 51s, Triple A team for the Toronto Blue Jays. Redding was released by the 51s on August 10. Redding was signed by the Sugar Land Skeeters of the Atlantic League of Professional Baseball on August 17.

Post-playing career
He was named pitching coach for Auburn Doubledays – Washington Nationals Class A Short Season Affiliate of the New York–Penn League for the 2017 season.

Redding was named as pitching coach for the Hagerstown Suns for the 2018 season.

References

External links

Sportsnet (MLB stats)
Pura Pelota (VPBL stats)

1978 births
Living people
Albuquerque Isotopes players
American expatriate baseball players in Mexico
American expatriate baseball players in South Korea
Auburn Doubledays players
Baseball coaches from New York (state)
Baseball players from New York (state)
Buffalo Bisons (minor league) players
Charlotte Knights players
Colorado Springs Sky Sox players
Columbus Clippers players
Houston Astros players
KBO League pitchers
Kissimmee Cobras players
Las Vegas 51s players
Lehigh Valley IronPigs players
Leones del Caracas players
American expatriate baseball players in Venezuela
Major League Baseball pitchers
Michigan Battle Cats players
Minor league baseball coaches
Mexican League baseball pitchers
Monroe Community College alumni
Monroe Tribunes baseball players
New Orleans Zephyrs players
New York Mets players
New York Yankees players
Portland Beavers players
Rieleros de Aguascalientes players
Round Rock Express players
Samsung Lions players
San Diego Padres players
Scranton/Wilkes-Barre Yankees players
Southern Maryland Blue Crabs players
Sportspeople from Rochester, New York
Sugar Land Skeeters players
Sultanes de Monterrey players
Tiburones de La Guaira players
Washington Nationals players